William Powell (1907–1992) was Mayor of Hamilton, Canada, from 1980 to 1982.

Born in St. Helen's, Lancashire, England, his family emigrated to Canada in 1911.  While his family returned to England, Powell came to Hamilton in 1921, and eventually found work at Stelco, a steel company based in Hamilton.

In 1958, he ran as the Co-operative Commonwealth Federation candidate in Hamilton East.  He placed third with 21.6% of the vote, losing to incumbent Quinto Martini, a Progressive Conservative.  Two years later, he was elected as an alderman in Ward 4.  He served in this post until 1970.  During his time as alderman, he also retired from his work at Stelco.

In 1970, he ran for a seat on the Board of Control, but was unsuccessful.  Following his defeat, he assumed the Chairmanship of the Hamilton Region Conservation Authority and stayed in that position for a decade.

In 1980, he defeated incumbent mayor, Jack MacDonald.  He served until 1982, when he was defeated by Bob Morrow.

In 1985, he was appointed as alderman for Ward 3 in order to fill a vacancy.

1907 births
1992 deaths
Mayors of Hamilton, Ontario
Ontario candidates for Member of Parliament
Co-operative Commonwealth Federation candidates for the Canadian House of Commons